Neobus is the tradename of Brazilian bus manufacturer San Marino Ônibus e Implementos Ltda (San Marino bus and Implements Limited) based in Caxias do Sul, Rio Grande do Sul.  Neobus initiated production of buses in 1996 and has already manufactured over 30,000 vehicles. The company manufactures the bodies for a whole range of coaches, e.g. microbus, intercity and touring coach. Its primary manufacturing plant, located in Caxias do Sul.

Navistar partnership with Neobus

On 1 February 2012, Navistar announced that it will form a joint venture with Neobus, for the manufacturing and developing fully integrated buses under the NeoStar brand, which will initially focus on North American and South American markets.

Products
 City Class an Iveco based medium duty bus.
 Mega – a Mercedes-Benz or Volkswagen based transit bus.
 Mega 1996
 Mega Evolution
 Mega 2000 
 Mega 2004 
 Mega 2006
 Mega BRT – an articulated bus.
 Mega BRS – a single version of the BRT.
 Mega BRS Low Entry – a low floor version of the BRS
 Mega Low Entry – a lower density version of the BRS Low Entry
 Spectrum – an Agrale or Mercedes-Benz based transit bus.
 Spectrum City
 Spectrum Class – an executive coach
 Spectrum Road – a tourist coach
 Thunder – a smaller bus available as in transit, tourist or executive versions.

References

External links

 Neobus website
 Neobus website (English)

Bus manufacturers of Brazil
Companies based in Rio Grande do Sul
Privately held companies of Brazil
Brazilian brands